Agusan del Sur's 1st congressional district is the congressional district of the Philippines in Agusan del Sur. It has been represented in the House of Representatives of the Philippines since 2010. Previously included in Agusan del Sur's at-large congressional district from 1987 to 2010, it encompasses the northern part of the province, bordering Agusan del Norte. It is currently represented in the 18th Congress by Alfel Bascug of the National Unity Party.

Representation history

Election results

2010

2013

2016

2019

See also 
 Legislative districts of Agusan del Sur

References 

Congressional districts of the Philippines
Politics of Agusan del Sur
2008 establishments in the Philippines
Congressional districts of Caraga
Constituencies established in 2008